Javokhir Sokhibov (Uzbek Cyrillic: Жавоҳир Соҳибов; born 1 March 1995) is an Uzbek footballer who plays as a midfielder for Turon in the Uzbekistan Pro League.

Career
Sokhibov started playing in Pakhtakor since 2013. In 2013, he played only in 2 matches for Pakhtakor in League matches. He made his debut in the League on 30 June 2013 in the Tashkent derby match against Bunyodkor, coming on in the 81st minute.
He played in 5 matches of the 2015 AFC Champions League for Pakhtakor. In the 2015 season he completed 14 matches in League (as of 25 August 2015).

International
He was one of the leading players of Uzbekistan U-19 in the 2014 AFC U-19 Championship. In 2015, he captained  Uzbekistan U-20 in the 2015 FIFA U-20 World Cup where Uzbekistan U-20 reached the quarter-finals of the tournament. Sokhibov completed all 5 matches of the national team in the U-20 World Cup.

On 3 September 2015 Uzbekistan's main national team coach Samvel Babayan called up Sokhibov to play in the 2018 World Cup qualifying match against Yemen. Sokhibov made his debut in a match against Yemen, playing in the starting eleven and was replaced after first half.

Honours
 Uzbek League (1): 2014
 Uzbekistan Super Cup runners-up: 2015

Career statistics

Club

References

External links
 
 
 
 

Uzbekistani footballers
1995 births
Living people
Pakhtakor Tashkent FK players
PFC Lokomotiv Tashkent players
Uzbekistan Super League players
Uzbekistan international footballers
Association football midfielders